Marijan in Iran may refer to:
 Marijan, Amol
 Marijan, Larijan, Amol County